The Caledonia Trophy was a short-lived Scottish football competition between Division A club Aberdeen and a Highland League select team. The two-legged competition lasted for three seasons.

History 

Aberdeen first suggested the idea in February 1948, which received the backing of the Highland League. The SFA secretary, Mr G. Graham, had the competition rules drawn up.

The same format as the Mitchell Cup was used (Aberdeen played Dundee on a home and away basis). The League president, Mr J. Riggs, supported this format.

Pittodrie hosted the first game and a Highland League stadium had the return match. The trophy was presented by the Express''' Saturday newspaper, the Green Final''.

Selection for the Highland League representative team was kept simple. Each league club was asked to nominate suitable players from their own team.

In 1948–49, Caledonian FC faced a heavy league programme so no players were released for the Pittodrie match.

In 1949–50, the Highland League were forced to make player alterations for the second leg. Bruce (Caley keeper) withdrew for personal reasons. Wilson and Hope of Elgin City were replaced by Baird and MacDonald of Fort George.

No competition took place in 1950–51. Both parties never agreed on a suitable date for the opening match.

Results

References

External links 

 

Highland Football League
Aberdeen F.C.
Defunct football cup competitions in Scotland
Football in Highland (council area)
Football in Aberdeenshire
Football in Aberdeen
Recurring sporting events established in 1948
Recurring sporting events disestablished in 1950
1948 establishments in Scotland
1950 disestablishments in Scotland